Plakevulin A is a bio-active metabolite of the sea sponge Plakortis.

References

Methyl esters
Diols